Carcina haemographa is a moth in the family Depressariidae. It was described by Edward Meyrick in 1937. It is found in the Democratic Republic of the Congo (West Kasai, Equateur).

References

Moths described in 1937
Peleopodinae